Cynips is a genus of gall wasps in the tribe Cynipini, the oak gall wasps. One of the best known is the common oak gall wasp (Cynips quercusfolii), which induces characteristic spherical galls about two centimeters wide on the undersides of oak leaves.

As of 2008, there are about 39 species in this genus.

Some authors have included Antron in Cynips but it was recently resurrected as a distinct genus.

Species
 Cynips agama
 Cynips caputmedusae
Cynips conspicua – fuzzy gall wasp
 Cynips cornifex
 Cynips disticha
 Cynips divisa – red-pea gall
Cynips douglasii – spined turbaned gall wasp
 Cynips fusca
Cynips izzetbaysali
 Cynips longiventris
Cynips mirabilis – speckled gall wasp
Cynips multipunctata – gray midrib gall wasp
 Cynips quercusechinus – urchin gall wasp
 Cynips quercusfolii
 Cynips schlechtendali

Former species 
The wasp formerly named Cynips saltatorius is now named Neuroterus saltatorius.

References 

Cynipidae
Hymenoptera genera
Gall-inducing insects